Hedayatollah Behboudi Kalhori (هدایت الله بهبودی کلهری; born 9 may 1960), known as Hedayatollah Behboudi (Persian: هدایت الله بهبودی) is an Iranian Shia writer and reporter. He was born in Tabriz, and left for Tehran in 1964. He graduated in the field of history from University of Tehran in 1992.

Behboudi is a researcher and historian (of the Iran–Iraq War; commonly known as "holy defense" in Iran), began his career as a reporter at the beginning of the Iran-Iraq war. He also became a correspondent for the Tehran Times newspaper. After three years, he moved to the office of Jomhouri Eslami. Eventually, Behboudi moved into art; and found the office of the Islamic Revolution Literature. He became the quarterly editor-in-chief of history studies.

Compilations 

Among the known compilations of Behboudi are:

"Sharh-e Esm" (name description), which is in regards to the biography of Iran's supreme leader, Seyyed Ali Khamenei;
"Alef-Laam Khomeini" (A, L, Khomeini); which is concerning Iran's first supreme leader biography, Seyyed Ruhollah Khomeini;
"Safari Be Mantagheye Mamnoo'eh" (A Trip To The Prohibited Zone)
"Khorramshahr, Ku Jahan-Ara" ([the city of] Khorramshahr, where is Jahan-Ara);
"Khorramshahr, Khaneh Ru Be Aftab" (Khorramshahr, the house towards sun);
"Safar Bar Madare-Mahtab" (journey on the moonlight circuit);
"Safar Be Halabcheh" (Journey to Halabcheh);
"Medal-Wa-Morakhasi" (Medal and leave);
"Pa be Paye Baran" (foot to foot of rain);
"Safar be Roosieh" (Journey to Russia);
"Safar be Gholleha" (trip to the tops);
 Jomhoori Islami Be Rewayate Asnaade Savak (Islamic Revolution According to Savak Documents)
 Ruzshomare Tarikhe Moasere Iran (Contemporary history journal of Iran)
 Morteza ayeneye Zendegi-am Bood (Morteza was my life's mirror)
 Tariz Dar Enghelab (Tabriz in Enghelab)
 Shahid Sadoughi (Martyr Sadoughi)

See also 
 Alef-Laam Khomeini
 Jalal Al-e Ahmad Literary Awards
 Iran's Book of the Year Awards

References 

Living people
Iranian writers
1960 births
People from Tabriz
20th-century Iranian historians
Shia Muslims
Reporters and correspondents
21st-century Iranian historians